Creation/Destruction (stylized as Creation | Destruction) is the second studio album by American metalcore band Fit for a King. It was released on March 12, 2013, through Solid State Records and was produced by Andreas Magnusson. The album attracted both commercial successes and positive criticism.

Critical reception

Creation/Destruction garnered significantly positive reception from eight music critics ratings and reviews. At HM, Jef Cunningham rated the album four stars out of five, stating it is a "solid release". Graeme Crawford of Cross Rhythms rated it a perfect ten squares, writing that "On this form they deserve to be in the highest league of Christian metal bands". At Jesus Freak Hideout, Michael Weaver rated the album four stars out of five, saying that because of this album and others "Solid State is poised to reclaim their title as Christian metal kings." Scott Fryberger of Jesus Freak Hideout rated the album four stars out of five, stating that "It's a little generic, and they probably could have done a lot more as far as creativity to give each song more of a distinct flair, but I think they could pull that off with another album or two under their belts." At Indie Vision Music, Brody B rated the album four stars out of five, writing that "While Fit For A King are still young, they manage to create what is simply excellent metalcore." Gregory Heaney of AllMusic rated the album three stars out of five, saying that it is a "promising debut". At ChristCore, Anthony Ibarra rated the album a perfect five stars, stating that this is a "must have". Anthony Peronto of Christian Music Zine rated it 4.25 out of five, writing that the band "have proven themselves worthy" with this release. At Mind Equals Blown, Austin Gordon rated the album a 6.5 out of ten, saying that "When you're in the mood for it, simple is good."

Commercial performance
For the Billboard charting week of March 30, 2013, Creation/Destruction charted at No. 175 on the Billboard 200, No. 17 on the Christian Albums chart, No. 43 on the Top Rock Albums chart, No. 6 on the Hard Rock Albums, and No. 3 on the Heatseekers Albums chart. The album sold more than 3,100 copies in its first week of sales.

Track listing

Personnel
Credits adapted from AllMusic.

Fit for a King
 Ryan Kirby – unclean vocals
 Bobby Lynge – guitars, backing vocals
 Justin Hamra – guitars
 Aaron "Olan" Kadura – bass, clean vocals
 Jared Easterling – drums, clean vocals

Additional personnel
 Andreas Magnusson – production, engineering, mixing
 Brandon Ebel – executive production
 Troy Glessner – mastering
 Adam Skatula – A&R
 Ryan Clark – design

Charts

References

2013 albums
Solid State Records albums
Fit for a King (band) albums